The Canadian province of Quebec held municipal elections in its municipalities on November 7, 2021.

Results by region:

Note: (X) refers to being an incumbent

Bas-Saint-Laurent

Amqui

Matane

Mont-Joli

Rimouski

Mayor

Rimouski City Council

Rivière-du-Loup

Trois-Pistoles

-->

Saguenay–Lac-Saint-Jean

Alma

Dolbeau-Mistassini

Roberval

Saguenay

Mayor

Saguenay City Council

By-election
A by-election was held in District #14 on May 8, 2022. The results were as follows:

Saint-Félicien

Saint-Honoré

Capitale-Nationale

Baie-Saint-Paul

Boischatel

Donnacona

La Malbaie

L'Ancienne-Lorette

Lac-Beauport

Pont-Rouge

Quebec City

Mayor

Saint-Augustin-de-Desmaures

Sainte-Brigitte-de-Laval

Sainte-Catherine-de-la-Jacques-Cartier

Saint-Raymond

Shannon

Stoneham-et-Tewkesbury

Mauricie

La Tuque

Louiseville

Notre-Dame-du-Mont-Carmel

Shawinigan

Mayor

Shawinigan City Council

By-election
A by-election was held in des Montagnes District on June 5, 2022. The results were as follows:

Trois-Rivières

Mayor

Trois-Rivières City Council

Estrie

Bromont

Coaticook

Cookshire-Eaton

Cowansville

Farnham

Granby

Mayor

Granby City Council

Lac-Brome

Lac-Mégantic

Magog

Shefford

Sherbrooke

Mayor

Sherbrooke City Council

Val-des-Sources

Windsor

Montréal

Beaconsfield

Côte-Saint-Luc

Dollard-des-Ormeaux

Mayor

Dollard-des-Ormeaux City Council

Dorval

Hampstead

Kirkland

Montreal

Montreal West

Mount Royal

Participation – 6779 voters 
Rate – 48.7%
Number of registered electors – 13,908

Pointe-Claire

Westmount

Outaouais

Cantley

Chelsea

Gatineau

L'Ange-Gardien

La Pêche

Pontiac

Val-des-Monts

Abitibi-Témiscamingue

Amos

La Sarre

Rouyn-Noranda

Mayor

Rouyn-Noranda City Council

By-election
A municipal by-election was intended to be held December 4, 2022, following the election of Daniel Bernard in the 2022 Quebec general election. Louis Dallaire was the only candidate to run, and was therefore elected by acclamation.

Val-d'Or

Côte-Nord

Baie-Comeau

Port-Cartier

Sept-Îles

Nord-du-Québec

Chibougamau

Gaspésie–Îles-de-la-Madeleine

Chandler

Gaspé

Les Îles-de-la-Madeleine

Sainte-Anne-des-Monts

Chaudière-Appalaches

Beauceville

Lévis

Mayor

Lévis City Council

Montmagny

Saint-Apollinaire

Sainte-Marie

Saint-Georges

Saint-Henri

Saint-Lambert-de-Lauzon

Thetford Mines

Laval

Mayor

Laval City Council

Lanaudière

Charlemagne

Joliette

L'Assomption

Lavaltrie

L'Épiphanie

Mascouche

Mayor

Mascouche City Council

Notre-Dame-des-Prairies

Rawdon

Repentigny

Mayor

Repentigny City Council

Saint-Calixte

Saint-Charles-Borromée

Sainte-Julienne

By-election
A mayoral by-election was held December, 2022, following the resignation of Richard Desormiers as mayor. The results of the by-election were as follows:

Saint-Félix-de-Valois

Saint-Lin–Laurentides

Saint-Paul

Saint-Roch-de-l'Achigan

Terrebonne

Mayor

Terrebonne City Council

Laurentides

Blainville

Mayor

Blainville City Council

Boisbriand

Bois-des-Filion

Brownsburg-Chatham

Deux-Montagnes

Lachute

Lorraine

Mirabel

Mayor

Mirabel City Council

Mont-Laurier

Mont-Tremblant

Pointe-Calumet

Prévost

Rosemère

Saint-Colomban

Sainte-Adèle

Sainte-Agathe-des-Monts

Sainte-Anne-des-Plaines

Sainte-Marthe-sur-le-Lac

Sainte-Sophie

Sainte-Thérèse

Saint-Eustache

Mayor

Saint-Eustache City Council

Saint-Hippolyte

Saint-Jérôme

Mayor

Saint-Jérôme City Council

Saint-Joseph-du-Lac

Saint-Sauveur

Montérégie

Acton Vale

Beauharnois

Beloeil

Boucherville

Mayor

Boucherville City Council

Brossard

Mayor

Brossard City Council

Candiac

Carignan

Chambly

Châteauguay

Mayor

Châteauguay City Council

Contrecoeur

Coteau-du-Lac

Delson

Hudson

La Prairie

Les Cèdres

Les Coteaux

L'Île-Perrot

Longueuil

Mayor

Longueuil City Council

Marieville

McMasterville

Mercier

Mont-Saint-Hilaire

Notre-Dame-de-l'Île-Perrot

Otterburn Park

Pincourt

Richelieu

Rigaud

Saint-Amable

Saint-Basile-le-Grand

Saint-Bruno-de-Montarville

Saint-Césaire

Saint-Constant

Sainte-Catherine

Sainte-Julie

Sainte-Martine

Saint-Hyacinthe

Mayor

Saint-Hyacinthe City Council

Saint-Jean-sur-Richelieu

Mayor

Saint-Jean-sur-Richelieu City Council

Saint-Lambert

Saint-Lazare

Saint-Philippe

Saint-Pie

Saint-Rémi

Saint-Zotique

Salaberry-de-Valleyfield

Mayor

Salaberry-de-Valleyfield City Council

Sorel-Tracy

By-election
A mayoral by-election was held November 20, 2022, following the dismissal of Serge Péloquin as mayor due to a court order after it was discovered that Péloquin had hidden a recording device in the city clerk's office. The results of the by-election were as follows:

Varennes

Vaudreuil-Dorion

Mayor

Vaudreuil-Dorion City Council

Verchères

Centre-du-Québec

Bécancour

Drummondville

Mayor

Drummondville City Council

Nicolet

Plessisville

Princeville

Victoriaville

Mayor

Victoriaville City Council

Prefectural (warden) elections

Kamouraska

La Haute-Gaspésie

La Matapédia

La Vallée-de-la-Gatineau

Le Domaine-du-Roy

Le Granit

Le Haut-Saint-François

Le Rocher-Percé

Les Basques

Les Collines-de-l'Outaouais

Les Pays-d'en-Haut

Manicouagan

Maria-Chapdelaine

Minganie

Montcalm

Pontiac

Témiscamingue

Témiscouata

See also
Municipal elections in Canada
Electronic voting in Canada
2005 Quebec municipal elections
2006 Quebec municipal elections
2009 Quebec municipal elections
2013 Quebec municipal elections
2017 Quebec municipal elections

External links
Results

References

 
Municipal elections in Quebec
November 2021 events in Canada